KROK (95.7 FM) is a radio station broadcasting an adult album alternative music format. Licensed to South Fort Polk, Louisiana, United States, the station serves the area surrounding Fort Polk and Vernon parish and surrounding areas.  The station is currently owned by West Central Broadcasting

The station is one of only four adult album alternative stations in Louisiana. The other three are University run KSLU in Hammond KYMK in Maurice, and WXDR-LP in New Orleans.

References

External links

Radio stations in Louisiana
Radio stations established in 2003